Leptometopa is a genus of freeloader flies in the family Milichiidae. There are about 19 described species in Leptometopa.

Species
These 19 species belong to the genus Leptometopa:

 Leptometopa aelleni Papp, 1978
 Leptometopa albipennis (Lamb, 1914)
 Leptometopa beardsleyi Hardy & Delfinado, 1980
 Leptometopa broersei Meijere, 1946
 Leptometopa coquilletti (Hendel, 1907)
 Leptometopa flaviceps (Enderlein, 1934)
 Leptometopa halteralis (Coquillett, 1900)
 Leptometopa kaszabi Papp, 1976
 Leptometopa lacteipennis (Hendel, 1913)
 Leptometopa latipes (Meigen, 1830)
 Leptometopa mallochi Sabrosky, 1989
 Leptometopa matilei Sabrosky, 1978
 Leptometopa mcclurei Sabrosky, 1964
 Leptometopa nilssoni Sabrosky, 1987
 Leptometopa niveipennis (Strobl, 1898)
 Leptometopa pacifica Papp, 1984
 Leptometopa pecki Papp, 1984
 Leptometopa rufifrons Becker, 1903
 Leptometopa veracildae Mello, Rodrigues & Lamas, 2007

References

Further reading

 

Milichiidae
Carnoidea genera
Articles created by Qbugbot